The Donau-Iller-Nahverkehrsverbund (German for Danube-Iller Local Transport Association, abbreviated DING, the German word for thing) is a regional transport cooperative that coordinates tickets and fares among all transport operators in the area of the city of Ulm and the districts of Alb-Donau, Biberach and Neu-Ulm. It was founded in 1998 and is a public funding body.

External links 
 the DING homepage in German

Companies based in Ulm
Transport in Ulm
Transport associations in Baden Württemberg
1998 establishments in Germany
Transport companies established in 1998